The General Aptitude Test Battery (GATB) is a work-related cognitive test developed by the U.S. Employment Service (USES), a division of the Department of Labor. It has been extensively used to study the relationship between cognitive abilities, primarily general intelligence, and job performance.

National Academy of Science review (1989) 
The test was extensively reviewed by the National Academy of Science in 1989 in the report Fairness in Employment Testing.

NAS concluded that the GATB is "adequate in psycho-metric quality", but that there were two problems if it was to be extensively used in practice. The first was that there were few alternate forms, which makes it likely that others will obtain a copy of the test and provide on-test training which decreases the validity. The second was that many of the tests were heavily speeded (timed), and that there were several easy to test strategies for increasing scores on speeded tests e.g. filling out the remaining items with random answers when one is running out of time. The report similarly examined questions of test bias (finding some bias in favor of Blacks), validity (finding lower validity, average r = .25 to .35, than reported elsewhere, and that this was primarily due to methodological differences).

GATB Race-Norming Controversy 

Beginning in 1981 with little publicity, the United States Employment Service began "race-norming" the reports of results of the GATB.  The aim of this practice was to counteract alleged racial bias in aptitude tests administered to job applicants, as well as in neuropsychological tests. The practice converted and compared the raw score of the test according to racial groups. The score of a black candidate was only compared and reported to the scores of those who had the same ethnicity. 

In the case of the GATB, USES did not alter the candidate's actual test score.  A test score of, say, 300 was still the same measure of test performance across all race categories. If, for instance, a black candidate's score, which was reported within a percentile range, fell within a certain percentile when compared to white or all candidates, it would be much higher among other black candidates. The USES therefore reported results as a percentile figure only compared within each racial category (i.e. -- if a 300 score of Hispanic applicant were a 42nd percentile of scores within the Hispanic category, the result was reported as 42).  People having the identical test scores were ranked for employment aptitude either higher or lower based on their racial categories, with favored results for black and Hispanic category testers relative to white and Asian category testers.  

The race-norming in reported GATB individual results did not affect the demographic and statistical validity of the underlying actual GATB test scores.

In 1990-1991 this practice became more widely known. The public controversy over it resulted in such race-norming of employment testing being explicitly outlawed by the  Civil Rights Act of 1991.

Composition 
The battery consists of a 12 tests which purport to measure 9 abilities or aptitudes:

(Table after Hunt 1983.)

The abilities are also sometimes clustered into 3 groups: cognitive (G, V, N), perceptual (S, P, Q) and psychomotor (K, F, M).

References 

Cognitive tests